The Urge is the third solo album released by bassist Stuart Hamm, released in 1991. It was the first of Hamm's solo albums to feature vocals, and included guest appearances by guitarist Eric Johnson and Tommy Lee of Mötley Crüe. The song "Quahogs Anyone?" was recorded live at Santa Barbara on September 27, 1990.

Hamm's signature Fender bass guitar was also called "The Urge", and was followed by "The Urge II".

Track listing
 "Welcome to My World" – 1:36
 "The Hammer" – 4:53
 "Who Do You Want Me to Be Today?" – 6:07
 "If You're Scared, Stay Home!" – 5:32
 "Our Dreams" – 6:05
 "Lone Star" – 7:24
 "Quahogs Anyone? (119, 120 Whatever It Takes)" – 6:12
 "The Urge" – 7:09
 "As Children" – 6:01

Personnel
 Stuart Hamm - Bass guitar, Piccolo Bass, Vocals, Background Vocals and Keyboards
 Eric Johnson - Electric Guitar on "Our Dreams and "Lone Star"
 Harry K. Cody - Electric Guitar
 Buzzy Feiten - Electric Guitar and Additional Vocals
 Dawayne Bailey - Electric Guitar
 Steve Recker - Electric Guitar
 Micajah Ryan - Acoustic Guitar on "Our Dreams", Background Vocals, Mixing, Engineering
 Jonathan Mover - Drums and Additional Vocals
 Steve Smith - Drums
 Tommy Mars - Background Vocals
 Steve Madero Horns - Background Vocals, Additional Vocals
 Tommy Lee - Additional Vocals
 Tanya Papanicolas - Whisper
 Shawn Berman - Vocals, Samples, Engineering Assistance
 Bob Arkin - Additional Vocals
 Bruce Hamm - Additional Vocals
 Emily Ryan - Additional Vocals
 Dan Goldberg - Additional Vocals
 Jorge Bermudez - Additional Vocals, Percussion
 Chris Hamm - Vocal Chant
 Greg Fulginiti - Mastering
 Lori Stoll - Cover Photography
 Mark Leiloha - Live Photography
 David Bett - Art Direction
 Stuart Hamm - Producer

References

Stuart Hamm albums
1991 albums